This is a list of U.S. Virgin Islands territorial symbols:

References

symbols